Byala Reka is a village in Parvomay Municipality, Plovdiv Province, Bulgaria. In 2006, the population was 969.

Villages in Plovdiv Province